Sergey Sergeevich Chumakov (born 7 June 1972, Moscow) is a Soviet and Russian pop singer.

In 1988, Sergey met with the poet Alexander Shaganov, who later would become his producer (1991–93).
In 1990 Sergey acquainted with the composer Valery Bashenev, wrote the music for most of the performance of the songs.
In February 1991 Chumakov became the winner of the TV contest Morning Star.
In May of the same year with the group  Lyube  toured Ukraine.
In 1991–94 Chumakov has toured extensively in Russia and CIS countries, participates in various competitions and contest Hit 92 in St. Petersburg Chumakov has won the first prize. In 1993 he stopped his creative collaboration with Shaganovym. New producer singer became a composer Igor Azarov. Released the album  Go Ahead-Walk , but to repeat the success of their debut album, he failed and became hits only the title track and the song Nikita Married.

The next producer was Chumakov Alexey Muscatin. Singer began working in the style of Western music 50-60s. Influence on his work produced notable performers such as Elvis Presley, Paul Anka, Louis Prima, the band Creedence Clearwater Revival. During this period, losing popularity singer even made peace with Alexander Shaganov. In the third album for the first time included a few songs on his poems. However, an attempt to execute Chumakov ersatz Western music failed. The album has completely failed and Chumakov disappeared from the screens.

According Shaganov fading career Sergey contributed to conflict with Alla Pugacheva and the singer addicted to alcohol.

In 2010 Chumakov resumed musical career.

External links

 Official Website
  Information multiportal

1972 births
Living people
Soviet pop singers
Russian pop singers
Singers from Moscow
Soviet child singers
21st-century Russian singers